Wonthaggi wind farm is a wind power station at Wonthaggi in Gippsland, Victoria, Australia. It has 6 wind turbines, with a total generating capacity of 12 MW of electricity.

Technical Details
Each of the turbines is a German made Senvion (formerly REpower) MM82 turbines, with a rotor diameter of 82m, and each nacelle sitting on an Australian made  69m tall tower. The farm is operated by eDL Energy Australia, and became operational in December 2005.

Blade Snapping Incident
In March 2012 one of the rotor blades snapped, Senvion (formerly REpower), the manufacturers of the turbine, replaced the blades. The fault was due to a manufacturing defect.

See also

Wind power in Australia

References

External links 
Wind Power page on Wonthaggi Wind Farm

Wind farms in Victoria (Australia)